Andrey Kan (born 5 November 1971) is a Belarusian gymnast. He competed in eight events at the 1996 Summer Olympics.

References

External links
 

1971 births
Living people
Belarusian male artistic gymnasts
Olympic gymnasts of Belarus
Gymnasts at the 1996 Summer Olympics
People from Baranavichy
Sportspeople from Brest Region